Omar Hasanin (born 15 November 1978) is a Syrian road bicycle racer. He competed at the 2012 Summer Olympics in the Men's road race, but failed to finish.

Major results

2000
 1st National Road Race Championships
 1st National Time Trial Championships
2005
 2nd Asian Road Race Championships
 2nd Overall Milad De Nour Tour
1st Stage 2
 3rd Overall Tour of Iran (Azerbaijan)
1st Stage 1
2006
 1st Stages 1, 4 & 6 Tour of Iran (Azerbaijan)
 2nd Arab Road Race Championships
 3rd Asian Road Race Championships
2007
 2nd Overall Tour of Libya
2008
 1st Overall Tour of Libya
 1st Stage 1 Tour de East Java
 3rd International Grand Prix Al-Khor
 3rd International Grand Prix Messaeed
 3rd Arab Time Trial Championships
2009
 2nd Arab Road Race Championships
 3rd HH Vice-President's Cup
 3rd Emirates Cup
2010
 1st Stage 9 Tour du Maroc
 1st Stage 3 Tour of Victory
 2nd Arab Road Race Championships
2011
 2nd Overall Tour of Marmara
1st Stage 2
 2nd Golan I
 2nd Arab Road Race Championships

References

Syrian male cyclists
1978 births
Living people
Olympic cyclists of Syria
Cyclists at the 2012 Summer Olympics
Cyclists at the 2006 Asian Games
Asian Games competitors for Syria
Sportspeople from Damascus
21st-century Syrian people